State Route 43 (SR 43) is a primary state highway in the U.S. state of Virginia. The southern portion of the state highway runs  from U.S. Route 29 Business (US 29 Bus.) in Altavista north to the Blue Ridge Parkway at Peaks of Otter. The southern portion of the state highway connects Altavista with Bedford and Peaks of Otter. The northern section of SR 43 follows the James River through a narrow valley (Narrow Passage Road) between Buchanan and Eagle Rock.

SR 43 is a Virginia Byway except south of the US 29 bypass of Altavista.

Route description

SR 43 has two disjoint sections.  SR 43 begins at an intersection with US 29 Business (Main Street) in the town of Altavista.  The terminus is just north of the Roanoke River, which forms the boundary between Campbell and Pittsylvania counties.  The junction is also adjacent to the crossing of Norfolk Southern Railway's Altavista and Danville district rail lines.  SR 43 heads northwest as Bedford Avenue to the town limit at the highway's diamond interchange with US 29 (Wards Road).  The state highway continues north as Bedford Highway toward Lynch Station, where the highway curves to the southwest to parallel the north bank of the Roanoke River.  At Leesville, a short distance north of the impoundment of the river to form Leesville Lake, SR 43 begins to follow Goose Creek and enters Bedford County.  The state highway, now named Leesville Road, veers northwest and intersects SR 626 (Smith Mountain Lake Parkway) and SR 628 (Mentow Drive) in the hamlet of Mentow.  SR 628 is also known as Bishop Creek Road, which provides a shorter, parallel route to SR 43 between Lynch Station and Mentow.

In the hamlet of Gillespie, SR 43 intersects SR 24 (Wyatts Way); the two highways head west concurrently as Glenwood Drive.  West of Gillespie, SR 24 continues west as Shingle Block Road and SR 43 heads north along Virginia Byway toward Bedford, where the highway becomes South Street.  Just after entering the town, the state highway crosses over US 460 and US 221 with no access.  Just south of downtown, SR 43 splits into a pair of two-way street: northbound follows Talbott Street and Otey Street to Main Street while southbound follows South Street, which is one-way southbound for one block immediately south of Main Street.  SR 43 turns west onto Main Street and has a very short concurrency with US 460 Bus.  Two blocks to the west, SR 43 turns north onto Bridge Street, where the highway runs together with US 221 Bus. (signed as US 221) and SR 122 Bus. across Norfolk Southern's Blue Ridge District.  North of the railroad bridge, SR 43 turns west onto Peak Street; US 221 Bus. and SR 122 Bus. heads northeast on Longwood Avenue.

SR 43 exits the town of Bedford on Peaks Road, which crosses the Otter River on its way to Blue Ridge Mountain.  The state highway enters Jefferson National Forest and ascends the mountain among the Peaks of Otter.  The southern section of SR 43 reaches its northern terminus at the Blue Ridge Parkway adjacent to the Peaks of Otter Visitor Center.  The Blue Ridge Parkway heads northwest to Bearwallow Gap, where the northern section of SR 43 begins at an interchange.  The state highway, which is named Parkway Drive, enters Botetourt County and descends Cove Mountain to the town of Buchanan.  SR 43 turns onto Main Street and has a short concurrency with US 11 to cross the James River.  On the north side of the river, the state highway turns west onto First Street and leaves the town as Narrow Passage Road, which re-enters the national forest.  SR 43 passes under Interstate 81 with no access and parallels the river past James River High School and the community of Springwood. Narrow Passage Road then continues on to the town of Eagle Rock, where the highway is known as Second Street and passes through a water gap between Rathole Mountain and Crawford Mountain.  The state highway follows the river north a short distance to its northern terminus at US 220 (Botetourt Road).

Major intersections

References

External links

Virginia Highways Project: VA 43

043
State Route 043
State Route 043
State Route 043
State Route 043
043